The sculpted lanternshark (Etmopterus sculptus) is a shark of the family Etmopteridae found from the Southeast Atlantic and Southwest Indian Ocean, specifically from Namibia to southern Mozambique and the Madagascar Ridge. Etmopterus sculptus is a moderately large species of Etmopterus.

References

Etmopterus
Fish described in 2011